The Tres Marias cottontail or Tres Marias rabbit (Sylvilagus graysoni) is a species of mammal in the family Leporidae.

Distribution and habitat
It is endemic to the Tres Marias Islands, part of the Mexican state of Nayarit. The rabbit is abundantly found in both the Madre and Magdalena islands but only has some occurrences in the Cleofa island. Its natural habitat is subtropical or tropical dry forests.

Conservation
It is threatened by habitat loss.

Ecology
The rabbit only has three predators - the Tres Marias raccoon (Procyon lotor insularis), a subspecies of the common raccoon, and two birds of prey: the red-tailed hawk (Buteo jamaicensis) and the crested caracara (Caracara plancus).

References

Sylvilagus
Endemic mammals of Mexico
Islas Marías
Mammals described in 1877
Taxonomy articles created by Polbot
Jalisco dry forests